Texas's 13th congressional district is a congressional district in the U.S. state of Texas that includes most of the Texas Panhandle, parts of Texoma and northwestern parts of North Texas. The principal cities in the district are Amarillo, Gainesville and Wichita Falls. It winds across the Panhandle into the South Plains, then runs east across the Red River Valley. It covers more land mass than thirteen entire states.

The district has been represented  in the United States House of Representatives by Republican Ronny Jackson since 2021, and previously by Republican Mac Thornberry, from 1995 until his decision not run for reelection in 2020. As late as 1976, Jimmy Carter won 33 of the 44 counties in the district, getting 60% to 70% of the vote in many of them. While voters in the Panhandle began splitting their tickets as early as the 1940s, Democrats continued to hold most local offices, as well as most of the area's seats in the state legislature, well into the 1990s.

Since Thornberry's ouster of three-term Democrat Bill Sarpalius in 1994, however, a Democrat has only crossed the 30 percent mark in 1996, 1998 and 2000. Republicans now dominate at nearly every level of government, and there are almost no elected Democrats left above the county level. In 2012, it gave Barack Obama his lowest percentage of the vote in a congressional district. He received 18.5% of the vote. In 2016, it was Hillary Clinton's second largest margin of defeat in a congressional district after . She received an even lower percentage than President Obama four years prior, gathering 16.9% of the vote compared to Donald Trump's 79.9%.

Election results from presidential races

List of members representing the district

Election results

Often in recent years, the incumbent has either run unopposed or has only a third/fourth party candidate who is opposing them. Generally, the incumbent gets over 70% of the vote, even during years with huge opposition party pickups.

Historical district boundaries

See also
List of United States congressional districts

References

Citations

General sources

External links
 Congressional Biographical Directory of the United States 1774–present

13